Bator Sambuev (born November 25, 1980) is a Russian-Canadian chess player who holds the FIDE title of Grandmaster. He won the Canadian championship three times.

Early life and career
Born in Ulan-Ude, Russia, Sambuev was awarded by FIDE the titles of International Master in 1999 and Grandmaster in 2006. He immigrated to Toronto, Canada in June 2007 and moved to Montreal in 2010.  

He won the Canadian Closed Championship in 2011 after a two-game playoff against Eric Hansen. In 2012, Sambuev again won the Canadian championship, earning the right to play in the FIDE World Cup 2013, and took part for the first time in the Chess Olympiad, where he played for team Canada on the first board.

In the World Cup 2013, he played Alexander Morozevich in the first round. Sambuev won the first game and lost the second. Then he lost the rapidplay playoff by 1½-½ and as a result he was eliminated from the competition.

Sambuev was placed 2nd in the Toronto Labour Day Open and Toronto Holidays Open in 2007, the Toronto Hart House Holidays Open in 2008, the PWC Toronto Open, Toronto Labour Day Open and Toronto Thanksgiving Open in 2009, the Toronto Labour Day Open and Hart House Holidays Open in 2010, the Hart House Holidays Open in 2011, the Ontario Open in 2009, 2010 and 2011, and the Quebec Open in 2011. In 2011, Sambuev came 1st at the Hamilton Winter Open ahead of Wesley So, who he defeated in the 4th round.

Sambuev won the 2017 Canadian Championship (Zonal 2.2) on July 1, 2017 in Montreal. He finished =1st IM Nikolay Noritsyn in the 9-round Swiss with 8/9. They played four rapid games (15m + 10s) with White winning each time, but won the blitz play-off 1.5/0.5. In the play-off, Sambuev held Noritsyn's queen in his hand during the time-scramble, leading Noritsyn to promote to a queen using an upside-down rook. The arbiters, mistakenly believing the queen was still on the table, ruled Noritsyn's promotion to have been to a rook instead of a queen, leading to a win for Sambuev. After the match, Noritsyn filed an appeal with the Chess Federation of Canada (CFC) asking for the decision of the arbiters to be overruled. The CFC denied the appeal in a 3-1 vote.

References

External links
 
 
 
 
 

1980 births
Living people
Russian chess players
Canadian chess players
Chess grandmasters
Chess Olympiad competitors
People from Ulan-Ude
Russian emigrants to Canada